North Central West Virginia (sometimes known as "Mountaineer Country") is a region of the U.S. state of West Virginia. The region's largest city is Morgantown.

Counties 
Monongalia County
Marion County
Harrison County
Taylor County
Doddridge County

These counties are sometimes also included into the region depending on who is asked.

Barbour County
Lewis County
Upshur County
Preston County
Randolph County

Wetzel County would not be part of the region because not only does the county border Ohio, but also many West Virginians largely consider Wetzel County to be a part of the Northern Panhandle region, even though it does not lie within the actual "Panhandle."

Cities & Towns 
Morgantown
Fairmont
Mannington
Clarksburg
Bridgeport
Grafton
West Union

Note: These cities are sometimes included within the region.

Kingwood
Philippi
New Martinsville
Weston
Buckhannon
Elkins

Media

TV 
WBOY-TV-NBC-12
EBOY-TV-ABC-11
WDTV-TV-CBS-5
WNPB-TV-PBS-24
WVFX-TV-Fox-46

Radio 
WAJR - News/Talk/Sports-1440 AM
WVAQ - Top 40-101.9 FM
WKKW - Country-97.9 FM
WWLW - Adult Contemporary-106.5 FM
WCLG - Active rock-100.1 FM
WGYE - Country-102.7 FM
WRLF - Mainstream rock-94.3 FM
WPDX - Classic country-104.9 FM
WFGM-FM - Classic Top 40-93.1 FM
WVIW - Christian-104.1 FM
WKTZ-FM - Christian contemporary-95.9 FM
WZST - Country-100.9 FM
WOTR - Religious - 96.3 FM
WHTI - CHR/Top 40-105.7 FM
WVUS - Catholic-1190 AM
WXJ85 - NOAA Weather Radio-162.550 MHz

Print 
Times West Virginian (Fairmont)
The Dominion Post (Morgantown)
Clarksburg Exponent-Telegram (Clarksburg)

Transportation

Public Transit 

A network of intracity and intercity buses is provided in the area by three private services: CENTRA, the Fairmont Marion County Transit Authority, and the Mountain Line Transit Authority.

The Fairmont Marion County Transit Authority provides bus routes focusing within Marion County, but trips to the nearby cities of Clarksburg and Morgantown are also provided for a charge of $2.00, one way. Free transfers are provided at the Marion County courthouse. All routes within the county have a flat rate of $0.75, but for all routes, children under the age of 6 ride free.

CENTRA is a service based at the southern end of the region, serving the areas around Clarksburg and Harrison County.  Travel is facilitated by 16 individual lines that run weekdays from 6 AM to 6 PM, and Saturdays from 8 AM to 4 PM.

The Mountain Line Transit Authority provides bus routes in and around Monongalia County and WVU campuses. When WVU is in session, 18 routes around Morgantown provide service from as early as 6 AM to as late as 2:30 AM. During summer these hours are slightly reduced, and some routes are eliminated altogether. The Grey Line is a special intercity service connecting the area to Pittsburgh for a flate rate of $25.00 per ride. For regular routes, standard individual fare is $0.75, with special packages such as monthly passes or individual deviations. Transfers are $0.75, and children 5 and under ride free.

Highways

Interstates 
 Interstate 79
 Interstate 68

U.S. 
 U.S. Route 50
 U.S. Route 19
 U.S. Route 119
 U.S. Route 250

Appalachian Corridors
  Corridor D
  Corridor H

WV 
 West Virginia Route 20
 West Virginia Route 310
 West Virginia Route 7
 West Virginia Route 58
 West Virginia Route 57

Airports 
Morgantown Municipal Airport
North Central West Virginia Airport

Population

External links
Monongalia County
Marion County
Harrison County
North Central West Virginia Community Action Association
Animal Friends of North Central West Va
Community Foundation of North Central WV
North Central West Virginia American Red Cross
Scottish Heritage Society of North Central WV
Visit Mountaineer Country CVB

Regions of West Virginia